The Pacific Championship Series (PCS) is the top level of professional League of Legends in Taiwan, Hong Kong, Macau, Southeast Asia (excluding Vietnam), and Oceania. Riot Games, the game's developer, created the esports league on 19 December 2019. This followed an announcement three months prior by Garenathe game's distributor in Taiwan, Hong Kong, Macau, and Southeast Asiathat it planned to merge the League of Legends Master Series (LMS) and League of Legends SEA Tour (LST) into a single tournament jointly run with Riot Games. On 18 November 2022, Riot Games announced that Oceania would become a part of the PCS region and the League of Legends Circuit Oceania (LCO) would be downgraded to a tier-two league, secondary to the PCS.

The PCS has teams from four different countries and regions. Ten teams compete in the PCS regular season: eight from Taiwan, one from Hong Kong, and one from the Philippines. The top six teams from the PCS regular season and the top two teams from the LCO playoffs qualify for the PCS playoffs.

History

Prior to the PCS 
The first professional esports league for League of Legends players in Taiwan, Hong Kong, Macau, and Southeast Asia was the Garena Premier League (GPL), which ran from 2012 to mid-2018. Teams from Taiwan, Hong Kong, and Macau were given their own league, the League of Legends Master Series (LMS), in late 2014. Three years later, the Vietnam Championship Series (VCS) was upgraded to a Tier 1 tournament and Vietnam became its own competitive region, separate from the rest of Southeast Asia. The GPL was rebranded as the League of Legends SEA Tour (LST) in mid-2018.

Formation 
Garena announced on 25 September 2019 that it intended to merge the LMS and LST into a single league, the details of which would be released near the end of the year. On 19 December, Riot Games announced the name of the new league, the Pacific Championship Series (PCS), and a list of nine of the ten teams that would compete in it. Berjaya Dragons was announced as the last team joining the PCS on 17 January 2020.

Inaugural season 

The 2020 season was postponed until further notice on 29 January due to the COVID-19 outbreak. It was later announced on 18 February that the 2020 season would officially begin on 29 February.

On 13 February it was announced that G-Rex had disbanded its League of Legends team and forfeited its spot in the PCS as a result of internal restructuring by their parent company Emperor Esports Stars. Five days later, Machi Esports was announced as G-Rex's replacement.

Introduction of the LCO 
Riot Games announced on 18 November 2022 that the PCS would expand into Oceania beginning in 2023. Two major changes were made: The winners of the League of Legends Circuit Oceania would no longer directly qualify for the Mid-Season Invitational and the World Championship. Instead, the LCO's top two teams would have to compete in the PCS playoffs to gain a spot. Additionally, LCO players would have their residencies changed from "Oceania" to "PCS", meaning they would no longer take import slots on PCS teams, and vice versa.

Format

Regular season 
 Ten teams
 Double round-robin, best-of-one
 Top eight teams advance to playoffs

Playoffs 
 Ten teams: Eight from the PCS regular season, two from the LCO playoffs
 Double elimination bracket

Qualifications 
 The winner of the spring split qualifies for the Mid-Season Invitational
 The winner and runner-up of the summer split qualify for the World Championship as the PCS' first and second seeds respectively

Teams 
Ten teams were initially selected by Riot Games as permanent franchise partners of the PCS. However, it was announced on 4 August 2020 that a promotion tournament would be introduced for the 2021 season to promote regional competitiveness. The promotion tournament was later scrapped in 2022.

Taiwan, Hong Kong, the Philippines, and Singapore are currently represented in the PCS; Malaysia and Thailand were previously represented.

Current

Former

Results

Number of top three finishes

By team 
 denotes a team that no longer participates in the PCS.

By country or region

Notes

References

External links 
 

 
League of Legends competitions
Recurring sporting events established in 2019
Sports leagues in Asia